Peter James Murphy (born 13 February 1990) is an English former professional footballer who played primarily as a midfielder but was also a capable defender.

Career

Murphy joined Stanley as a 16-year-old. Towards the end of the 2007–08 season, he spent a few weeks on loan at Northern Premier League club Prescot Cables to gain experience, and signed his first professional contract with Stanley on his return from loan, in April 2008. He made his debut for Stanley on 26 April, in the Football League Two clash with Wrexham which ended as a 3–1 win. He signed a new contract in May 2010 and again in 2012. He then signed for Wycombe Wanderers in 2014 on a free transfer. He opened the scoring for Wycombe on his debut, as they beat Newport County 2–0.

He joined Morecambe on 8 June 2015. He scored his first goal for the club in a 4–2 loss against Cambridge United on 24 November 2015.

At the end of the 2016–2017 season, Murphy announced his retirement from playing, aged 27, following a long-term injury.

References

External links

1990 births
Living people
English footballers
Association football defenders
Accrington Stanley F.C. players
Prescot Cables F.C. players
Northern Premier League players
English Football League players
Wycombe Wanderers F.C. players
Morecambe F.C. players
Wigan Athletic F.C. non-playing staff